The Elk River Dam, completed in 1952, impounds the Elk River in the US state of Tennessee to form the Woods Reservoir.   The US Air Force and Arnold Engineering Development Center own and operate Woods Reservoir.  The dam itself is just under 3,000 feet long and holds back 26 billion gallons of water on a  reservoir.  The water is used to help the Arnold Air Force Base with cooling of their wind-tunnel equipment.

Water exiting from the dam flows along the Elk River into Tims Ford Lake.

References 

1952 establishments
Dams in Tennessee